Nikolay Yemelyanovich Aksyonenko (15 March 1949 – 20 July 2005) was a Russian railway manager and politician.

Biography

Early life 
Nikolay Aksyonenko was born on 15 March 1949 in the village of Novoaleksandrovka, Bolotninsky District, Novosibirsk Oblast. He was the youngest, 13th child in a large family of an assistant driver. In his youth, he was engaged in heavyweight boxing and football. After leaving school in 1966, he tried to enter the Novosibirsk Electrotechnical Institute, but he failed to pass the tests. In 1967 he entered the Novosibirsk Institute of Railway Engineers.

Railway worker 
In 1972 he was appointed as a duty officer at the Vikhorevka and Nizhneudinsk stations. In 1974 he was appointed head of the Azey station of the East Siberian Railway. From 1978 to 1979 — deputy head of the Otrozhka station of the South Eastern railway. Since 1979 he worked as deputy chief, then head of the traffic department of the Voronezh branch of the South Eastern railway. In 1984 he was transferred to the October Railway, where he held the positions of deputy head of the Murmansk branch (until 1985), Head of the Leningrad-Finland branch (until 1986), chief economist, first deputy head of the October Railway.

Federal government 
In 1994-1996, he held the post of deputy minister, since 1996 — first deputy minister, since 15 April 1997 — Minister of Railways of Russia. During his work, the Kizlyar—Kizilyurt railway was completed, telecommunication company TransTelekom was founded, a transit connection was established through the territory of Russia. At the same time, several dead-end railway branches were disbanded in Moscow Oblast.

Rumored successor of Yeltsin 
On 19 May 1999 Aksyonenko was appointed First Deputy Chairman of the Government within the Sergei Stepashin's Cabinet. Previously he was considered by Boris Yeltsin as a candidate for prime minister.

On 16 September 1999, Aksyonenko was re-appointed Minister of Railways in the Vladimir Putin's First Cabinet, retaining the post of First Deputy Prime Minister. He chaired the Government during Putin's trip to New Zealand. On 10 January 2000, Aksyonenko left the post of deputy premier, remaining minister of railways.

Last years 
In October 2001, Aksyonenko was summoned to the Prosecutor General's Office, where he was charged with abuse of office and misuse of profits. According to the auditors, the Railway Ministry top officials diverted money from the investment program in order to buy private apartments. On October 31, representatives of the Prosecutor General's Office reported that the federal budget lost more than 11 billion rubles as a result of Aksyonenko's actions.

On 3 January 2002, prime minister Mikhail Kasyanov proposed president Putin to dismiss Aksyonenko. On the same day, the president signed a corresponding decree, and Aksyonenko, in turn, submitted a letter of resignation. In October 2003, he left Russia for treatment in one of the foreign clinics (Aksyonenko suffered from leukemia).

Nikolai Aksyonenko died on 20 July 2005 at the Klinikum Großhadern, Munich. He was buried at Nikolskoe Cemetery of the Alexander Nevsky Lavra, Saint Petersburg.

Honours 
 Aksyonenko Square in Moshkovo, Novosibirsk Oblast
 Nikolay Aksyonenko, car-passenger ferry of the Kerch Strait ferry line

References 

1949 births
2005 deaths
People from Novosibirsk Oblast
20th-century Russian politicians
Deputy heads of government of the Russian Federation
Russian people in rail transport
Burials at Nikolskoe Cemetery